Jennifer Bishop aka Jenifer Bishop (born 1941) is an American film and television actress who was active from the early 1960s through to the 1970s. She was a regular on the television series Hee Haw. She had various roles in film that include Blood of Dracula's Castle in 1969, The Female Bunch in 1969, Impulse in 1974, and Mako: The Jaws of Death in 1976.

Background
She was born in 1941. Her parents were Albert and Marie. Being the first born she was named Alberta. She grew up in Camarillo, California and attended Camarillo High School. She then spent two years at Ventura College and her drama teacher there was a Dr. Wilkinson. After Ventura, she won a scholarship to got to Desilu Studios in Hollywood where she studied with Anthony Barr who would be an executive with ABC Studios. She studied method acting at Desilu Studios for two years before doing her first film. Her first film was Dime with a Halo which was directed by Boris Sagal. After that she went to New York for two years where she studied with Lee Strasberg.

Career

Television
In 1967, Bishop appeared in the television series Mission Impossible, playing a hostess in the Astrologer episode. She was credited as Barbara Bishop.
An original cast member, Bishop was one of the regulars in the Kornfield County based television series Hee Haw, that also featured with Slim Pickens, Barbi Benton etc. She appeared in episodes from the late 1960s though to the early 1970s.TV Rage  Jennifer Bishop, TV Appearances In 1975, she appeared in the series Cannon in The Deadly Conspiracy playing the part of Andrea Wayne.

Film
She appeared in the Bernard Girard directed 1969 film, The Mad Room, which was a remake of the 1941 film Ladies In Retirement. Shelley Winters, Stella Stevens and Severn Darden also starred in the film.Blu-ray.com Directed by Bernard Girard, The Mad Room 1969 She starred in the Sergei Goncharoff directed film House of Terror which was released around 1972/1973. In the film she played  Jennifer Andrews, a nurse who is hired to look after a man's unwell wife. She has an ex-con former boyfriend who has ideas for the wealth of the woman. After the woman dies, she marries her husband. The ex-con boyfriend who is still in the periphery has plans to get hold of the money.
 
Around the mid-1970s, she co-starred with Richard Jaeckel in the film Mako: The Jaws of Death. In addition to her and Jaeckel in this "Jaws''-similar" film, Harold Sakata and John Chandler also starred. The film was directed by William Grefe.

References

External links
 

American film actresses
American television actresses
20th-century American actresses
1941 births
Living people
21st-century American women